Rubus argutus is a North American species of prickly bramble in the rose family. It is a perennial plant native to the eastern and south-central United States. Common names are sawtooth blackberry or tall blackberry after its high growth.

Description 
R. argutus usually forms woody shrubs or vines, up to 2 meters (80 inches) in height, with thorns on stems, leaves, and flowers. The leaves are alternate and palmately compound. First-year plants have palmate leaves with 5 leaflets while second-year plants have palmate leaves with 3 leaflets. Second-year plants develop racemes of flowers each containing 5–20 flowers. The flowers are typically 5-merous with large, white petals and light green sepals, borne in mid-spring. Second-year plants are also capable of growing the fruit which gives the plant's common name, the blackberry. The fruits are compound drupes which change from bright red to black at maturity. Each section (drupelet) of a blackberry contains a single seed. Second year plants die after bearing fruits, but regrow from the underground portion of the plant.

There are many species of blackberries, which are edible and differ by size.

Distribution and habitat
The species grows from Florida to Texas, Missouri, Illinois, and Maine.

Uses
Blackberry leaves were in the official U.S. pharmacopoeia for a time and were said to treat digestive problems, particularly diarrhea. Their dried leaves make an excellent tea.

References

External links

 
 
 
 photo of herbarium specimen at Missouri Botanical Garden, collected in 1989 in Missouri
 US Wildflowers

argutus
Plants described in 1822
Flora of the United States